Wilków Pierwszy  is a village of the administrative district of Gmina Błędów, within Grójec County, Masovian Voivodeship, in east-central Poland.

The village has a population of 550.

References

Villages in Grójec County